The 1936 season of the Paraguayan Primera División, the top category of Paraguayan football, was played by 11 teams. The national champions were Olimpia.

Results

Standings

External links
Paraguay 1936 season at RSSSF

Para
Paraguayan Primera División seasons
Primera